Korobovskoye is a rural locality (a village) in Krasavino Urban Settlement, Velikoustyugsky District, Vologda Oblast, Russia. The population was 8 as of 2002.

Geography 
Korobovskoye is located 30 km northeast of Veliky Ustyug (the district's administrative centre) by road. Korolyovo is the nearest rural locality.

References 

Rural localities in Velikoustyugsky District